Nicholas Padilla (born December 24, 1996) is an American professional baseball pitcher for the Chicago White Sox of Major League Baseball (MLB). He made his MLB debut in 2022 with the Chicago Cubs.

Career
Padilla attended Cardinal Spellman High School in the Bronx, New York, and Grayson College. The Tampa Bay Rays in the 13th round of the 2015 MLB draft. 

The Chicago Cubs selected Padilla in the minor league phase of the 2020 Rule 5 draft. Padilla was called up to the majors for the first time on August 23, 2022. On September 6, the Cubs designated him for assignment.

On September 9, 2022, Padilla was claimed off waivers by the Chicago White Sox. He made seven appearances for the Triple-A Charlotte Knights to close out the year, posting a 3.00 ERA with six strikeouts in six innings pitched. Padilla was optioned to Triple-A Charlotte to begin the 2023 season.

See also
Rule 5 draft results

References

External links

1996 births
Living people
Sportspeople from the Bronx
Baseball players from New York City
Major League Baseball pitchers
Chicago Cubs players
Grayson Vikings baseball players
Gulf Coast Rays players
Hudson Valley Renegades players
Bowling Green Hot Rods players
Indios de Mayagüez players
South Bend Cubs players
Tennessee Smokies players
Iowa Cubs players
Cardinal Spellman High School (New York City) alumni
2023 World Baseball Classic players